Stefan Grimme (born 1963), is a German physical chemist; he completed a Ph.D. thesis on photochemistry at Technical University of Braunschweig in 1991; he is a professor at the Universität Bonn since 2011 who is active in the field of computational chemistry; he was elected a member of the Academy of Sciences Leopoldina in 2018.

Works

Literature 
 Steven M. Bachrach: Stefan Grimme // Computational Organic Chemistry, 2014.

Awards 
2015 Karl-Ziegler Lectureship Award from Max Planck Institute for Coal Research, Mülheim
2015 Gottfried Wilhelm Leibniz Prize from Deutsche Forschungsgemeinschaft
 2014 Thomson Reuters listed Prof. Dr. Stefan Grimme as a "highly cited chemist" for 2002–2012 in a list of only 300 chemists worldwide
2013 Schrödinger Medal of the World Association of Theoretical and Computational Chemists (WATOC)

See also 
Jörg Behler
Martin A. Suhm
Frank Neese

References

External links 

 
 

1963 births
Living people
21st-century German chemists
Academic staff of the University of Bonn
Members of the German Academy of Sciences Leopoldina
Gottfried Wilhelm Leibniz Prize winners
Schrödinger Medal recipients